Frank Mechaly (born May 9, 1975) in Marseille, France and raised in St. Tropez, is a jeans designer and brand maker, specializing in premium denim. Though he has successfully launched a number of brands including Sacred Blue and Blue Cult, he is probably best known as the founder and creator of 575 DENIM (now being renamed May75 brand) which has been embraced by celebrities such as Cameron Diaz who made a point of publicly acknowledging her affinity for the jeans during an appearance on Saturday Night Live. Mechaly has now launched his much-anticipated new brand of premium denim called RockStar.

Biography

Family History
Coming from a family with a deeply rooted history in the trade, Frank's grandfather used to import Levi's jeans into Morocco in the 50s. His father David Mechaly was the original creator and manufacturer of the legendary 70s brand MacKeen, which was the only premium denim brand with similar international recognition as Levis but started in the south of France. MacKeen did open offices in the U.S. and was worn by original cast members of Charlie's Angels (ironically Cameron Diaz who embraced Frank Mechaly's 575 DENIM jeans also starred in the modern remake of Charlie's Angels taking over the iconic role of Farrah Fawcett who wore his father's MacKeen jeans) Frank Mechaly's mother, Cathy Mechaly was also the original fit-model for MacKeen jeans.

Early years

Frank Mechaly draws upon his earliest memories of spending time at the factory with his father as the inspiration for his lifelong passion for designing jeans. Speaking in a candid interview he says: "I remember one particular Saturday morning back in the seventies, riding to the jeans factory with my father in his Porsche. I used to have free run of the entire factory as a child and in these days before stonewashing came about, I would go into one particular room and lie down in a huge pile of fresh denim, which has a very distinctive scent, and I knew at that time that I wanted to spend the rest of my life making jeans."

The young Mechaly spent many of his days playing in the factory and experimenting on his own designs using scraps of denim. But at nine years old family hardships hit the Mechaly family and his father experienced financial failure and the loss of his business. Frank went from attending private schools and having hired chauffeurs to public school and a very frugal living in which the family struggled.

Teen years

At age 15, Frank quit school and at 16 moved to St. Tropez, where he began to work in retail clothing stores as a sales person. He soon moved on to buying vintage clothing, especially vintage Levis and reselling for a profit. Eventually this developed into the opening of his own vintage store. Every week he took a train to Rouen to purchase several large bagfuls of jeans, military issue shirts and football jerseys, which he then washed, repaired and resold.

By the age of 18, Frank began to design freelance and worked for brands such as Blanc Bleu, H.Landers, D.D.P., and Texola, which was his own brand. He also created the brand Culture Couture. He would later go on to design the first line of Seven7 jeans in 2003.

Adulthood

In 1999, Frank's father David Mechaly moved from south of France to Los Angeles to start a new jeans company. Frank sent him samples of his Culture Couture brand and they decided to produce the line in the U.S. However, due to trademark issues in the U.S. it was renamed Blue Cult. Frank moved to the U.S. also.

Father and son separated. Then they reconciled their partnership to promote Frank's line Sacred Blue. But problems were apparent and in 2004 Frank Mechaly left the company of Blue Cult/Sacred Blue with nothing, only the intention of giving up and moving back to France. A female love interest at the time convinced him to stay in the U.S., which he did and then started the now famous brand 575 DENIM, which was started in July 2004 and incorporated in August 2004. Frank was helped by Maurice Marciano, the CEO of Guess, Inc, who hired him to produce private label apparel and admired his distinctive vintage, distressed and worn details in jeans.

Brands

575 DENIM

The first year that 575 DENIM brand launched, it was immensely successful. It was embraced by celebrities and particularly noted when actress Cameron Diaz, who was never paid for any endorsements, actually went to stores requesting to buy 575 DENIM and then wearing them at red carpet events and during her Saturday Night Live appearance. The brand was anticipated to have continued success when towards the end of 2004 they were sued by Levi Strauss & Co.

LEVI STRAUSS & Co. vs. Frank Mechaly

LEVI STRAUSS filed civil case number C 06 2402 against Frank Mechaly and his Jeanius Corporation because they felt that the 575 DENIM brand was infringing upon their 500 series jeans. Mechaly claimed that he never had any intention of doing that and that the brand was inspired by his birthday, which was on May 9, 1975 (5-75) and that he had simply wanted to stand out by using a number rather than a word or letters like most other brands.

The case was extremely costly for Mechaly, financially and emotionally. He spent three years in litigation to the point that he lost 90% of his business due to being unable to run daily operations while fighting the lawsuit. He was no longer able to pay the 300 employees he had on payroll and in 2007 he ran out of resources and chose to give in to a settlement. Part of the settlement stated that over the course of a year the brand name must change from 575 to MAY75.

RockStar
Frank Mechaly's next project was to launch his new brand "Rockstar".

Backed up by his good friend Richard Koral, Mechaly embarked on an ambitious new venture of launching a line of premium denim, dresses and shirts under the RockStar brand. His stated intentions are to maintain utmost quality in fabric, fit and formula, using the finest fabrics from Europe and Japan but completely produced and marketed in the U.S., utilizing U.S. workers rather than outsourcing to China, therefore insuring complete control over the quality and integrity of the process. RockStar is to be THE fashion high-end denim, according to Mechaly.

References

External links
Cameron Diaz, Lenny Kravitz and Jennifer Lopez For Frank Mechaly's 575 Denim
575 DENIM Biography, CoutureCandy
"Behind the Seams",People Magazine
"Franck Mechaly: Denim Guru de LA" ToutMa Magazine, April 2007

1975 births
American fashion designers
French fashion designers
American fashion businesspeople
Living people